Jessica Pegula and Erin Routliffe defeated the defending champion Caty McNally and her partner Anna Kalinskaya in the final, 6–3, 5–7, [12–10] to win the women's doubles tennis title at the 2022 Washington Open.

Coco Gauff and McNally were the reigning champions from when the event was last held in 2019, but Gauff did not participate.

Seeds

Draw

Draw

References

External links
Main draw

Citi Open - Doubles